Moke is a term used in the British Isles as slang for "donkey". In Australia it refers to a nag or inferior horse, and is employed by residents of the Hawaiian Islands in similar fashion as the British to derogatorily describe segments of the local Polynesian population. In practice, the word "moke" is similar to "redneck", as it is only used to describe a certain personality type, instead of an entire ethnic group.

In literature
Later portrayals include W. S. Merwin's The Folding Cliffs, and Paul Theroux's Hotel Honolulu.

Also of note is the reference in Captain Joshua Slocum's Voyage of the Liberdade, where the term refers to a native of the Bahamas.

J. R. R. Tolkien uses the word in the poem "Perry the Winkle;" e.g., "then all the people went with a will, by pony, cart, or moke".

Also see 

 Moke, definition on Wiktionary
 Mook, definition on Wiktionary
 Mini Moke, small British utility vehicle (styled "MOKE" in post-2012 revival version)

References

Hawaii culture
Hawaiian words and phrases